Camulus or Camulos is a Celtic deity who was identified with Mars via interpretatio romana. Camulus was an important god of Roman Britain and Gaul, especially among the Belgae and the Remi, a Gaulish people living in the region that is now modern Grand Est around Reims.

Name 
The etymology of the name is uncertain. It has been compared with the Old Irish cumall, meaning 'champion'.

Attestations
Evidence of Camulus' popularity can be seen in several place-names, notably Camulodunum.

Camulus is named in combination with Mars in inscriptions coming from Reims, Arlon, Kruishoutem, Rindern, Mainz, Bar Hill Fort near the Antonine Wall, Sarmizegetusa, and Southwark, London.

The town Camulodunum (now Colchester) in Essex may have been named after him (and is the conjectured basis for the legendary city of Camelot). Camulodunum is a Latinised form of the Brittonic Camulodūnon from Camulos plus dūnon "(hill)fort, stronghold", a reference to the town's extensive Iron Age earthwork defences.

Theories
Attempts from the 20th century and earlier to link the name Camulus with the nursery rhyme character Old King Cole, and with Irish mythological Cumhall, the hero Fionn's father, have been rejected by contemporary scholars.

References

Biblioography

Further reading
 .

Gaulish gods
War gods
Roman Colchester